NRG Ensemble is the debut album by American jazz multi-instrumentalist Hal Russell, which was recorded in 1981 and released on Nessa.
It was reissued in 2012 with new artwork and two bonus tracks previously unreleased from a demo tape the band gave to producer Chuck Nessa prior to the sessions.

Background
By the time he made his first commercially released LP with the NRG Ensemble in 1981, Hal Russell had already spent the better part of a decade experimenting with different sidemen, formations and instrumentations. This early version of the band included drummer and vibist Steve Hunt, two bassists, Brian Sandstrom and Curt Bley, and reedist Chuck Burdelik, a replacement for the departed Mars Williams, who left the group to tour with rock bands The Waitresses and The Psychedelic Furs. In addition to the drums, vibes, and saxophone, Russell threw in some shenai, cornet, and zither.

Reception
The Tiny Mix Tapes review by Clifford Allen says about the 2012 reissue "this wonderfully remastered and augmented early set is indispensable for fans of contemporary improvisation and those who want to hear more of Chicago’s creative music roots."

Track listing
All compositions by Hal Russell
 "Uncontrollable Rages" – 18:20
 "Kit Kat" – 5:40
 "Linda Jazz Princess" – 18:10 
 "Seven Spheres" – 5:05

Bonus tracks (2012 CD reissue)
"Lost Or?" - 11:50
"C Melody Mania" - 13:05
Recorded January 10, 1981

Personnel
Hal Russell – drums, vibes, C melody saxophone, shenai, cornet, zither
Chuck Burdelik – tenor saxophone, alto saxophone, clarinet, flute
Brian Sandstrom – bass, trumpet, gong
Curt Bley – bass
Steve Hunt – vibes, drums

References

1981 albums
Hal Russell albums
NRG Ensemble albums
Nessa Records albums